Kate Howarth may refer to:

Kate Howarth (writer) (born 1950), Australian writer
Kate Howarth (soccer) (born 1991), American soccer player